Mobilization is an academic journal that publishes original research and academic reviews of books concerned mainly with sociological research on protests, social movements, and collective behavior.

The journal was established in 1996 by Hank Johnston (San Diego State University). Johnston edited the journal for eleven years, after which he was succeeded by Daniel J. Myers (University of Notre Dame) and then Rory McVeigh (University of Notre Dame). During Johnston's run as editor, the journal moved first from two to three issues per year and, starting with volume eleven, eventually became a quarterly journal. The current editor-in-chief is Neal Caren (University of North Carolina at Chapel Hill).

According to the Journal Citation Reports, the journal has a 2019 impact factor of 1.327, ranking it 76th out of 150 journals in the category "Sociology" and making it the second-highest impact journal in social movement studies, behind Social Movement Studies.

References

External links 
 

Publications established in 1996
Sociology journals
Quarterly journals
Works about social movements
English-language journals